Longnor may refer to several places in England:

 Longnor, Shropshire, a village and civil parish
 Longnor, Staffordshire, a village and civil parish in the Peak District
 Longnor, South Staffordshire, a location